KKZX (98.9 FM) is a classic rock radio station serving the Spokane, Washington area. The station offers up a steady diet of rock music hits from the 1960s to the early 1990s.

In 2015, KKZX experimented with harder and more recent selections to try to compete with active rocker Rock 94 1/2.  However, the increasingly crowded rock competition, as well as the audience and listener input was negative towards the harder sound. As of January 2018, KKZX went back to a mix of classic rock, including Aerosmith, The Beatles, Fleetwood Mac, Led Zeppelin and The Rolling Stones, which the station is known for.  KKZX also cut back on Grunge Rock, as OZ 95.7 cut into the ratings and the creation of the new Alt 96 FM.

Personalities on the station includes Jim Arnold, Laura Hall and Jason McCollim. The station is an affiliate of The Beatle Years, Acoustic Storm, Nights with Alice Cooper, and Time Warp.  The station broadcasts with an ERP of 100 kW and is owned by iHeartMedia.

Programming is also heard on 100.9 K265AV Bonners Ferry, Idaho, serving Boundary County where FM reception is difficult due to mountainous terrain.

References

External links
KKZX official website

KZX
Classic rock radio stations in the United States
Radio stations established in 1975
1975 establishments in Washington (state)
IHeartMedia radio stations